Loxoneptera is a genus of moths of the family Crambidae.

Species
Loxoneptera albicostalis Swinhoe, 1906
Loxoneptera carnealis Hampson, 1896

References

Pyraustinae
Crambidae genera
Taxa named by George Hampson